"End of the Road" is an episode of Thunderbirds, a British Supermarionation television series created by Gerry and Sylvia Anderson and filmed by their production company AP Films (later Century 21 Productions) for ITC Entertainment. Written by Dennis Spooner and directed by David Lane, it was first broadcast on 25 November 1965 on ATV Midlands as the ninth episode of Series One. It is the 14th episode in the official running order.

Set in the 2060s, Thunderbirds follows the missions of International Rescue, a secret organisation which uses technologicallyadvanced rescue vehicles to save human life. The lead characters are exastronaut Jeff Tracy, founder of International Rescue, and his five adult sons, who pilot the organisation's primary vehicles: the Thunderbird machines. In "End of the Road", Tracy Island goes into security lockdown when it receives an unexpected visit from businessman Eddie Houseman, an old boyfriend of International Rescue member Tin-Tin Kyranoto the annoyance of Tin-Tin's admirer Alan Tracy. Eddie leaves the island none the wiser as to the Tracys' double lives, but when his desperate attempt to save his construction company's road-building project leaves his truck teetering on the edge of a cliff, the family are forced to risk security by going to the aid of someone who knows their public identity.

In 1966, Century 21 released an audio adaptation of "End of the Road" on vinyl EP record (Thunderbird 2, catalogue number MA 109) with narration from voice actor David Graham as regular character Brains. The episode had its first UKwide network broadcast on 10 January 1992 on BBC2.

Plot
Construction company Gray & Houseman is on course to complete its latest project: a mountain road in Southeast Asia. While co-founder Eddie Houseman captains an explosives truck blasting a way through the rock, his business partner Bob Gray heads the company's multi-storey Road Construction Vehicle, which tarmacs the path Eddie has cut.

Taking a holiday, Eddie pilots a light aircraft to Tracy Island to drop in on an old girlfriend: Tin-Tin Kyrano (voiced by Christine Finn). This unexpected visit forces Jeff (voiced by Peter Dyneley) to initiate the "Operation Cover-Up" security protocols to hide all trace of International Rescue. Tin-Tin is delighted to see Eddie and the couple spend the evening together. Alan (voiced by Matt Zimmerman), Tin-Tin's admirer, is teased by Virgil and Gordon (David Holliday and David Graham) for being left out.

At the road, the rock cutting is weakened by seismic activity and unseasonably early monsoon rains, bringing work to a halt. Hearing the news, Eddie flies home without saying goodbye to Tin-Tin, leaving her heartbroken. Eager to revive his own relationship with Tin-Tin, Alan is tactless in his attempt to console her, creating a rift between them. Grandma (voiced by Christine Finn) promises to help Alan get back into favour.

Aboard the Construction Vehicle, Eddie and Bob argue over solutions to the crisis. Eddie proposes blasting away the crumbling rock walls using nutomic explosives, but Bob, the senior partner, refuses to let Eddie risk his life and insists on postponing the project until the springeven though this will probably cost them the road contract and may even bankrupt the company. Undeterred, Eddie quietly sets off in the explosives truck and plants charges along the cutting. The seismograph on the Construction Vehicle alerts Bob and the others to a possible landslide. Discovering that Eddie is missing, Bob frantically radios the truck to warn him, but this only encourages Eddie to detonate early, without putting a safe distance between the truck and the explosions. Although the loose rock is dispersed, saving the road, the truck is hit by debris and left dangling over a cliff edge. Trapped inside, Eddie is unable to move without upsetting the truck's balance. Worse still, there are leftover charges on board: if the truck falls, it will explode on impact with the ground.

Bob radios International Rescue for help. Although going to Eddie's aid presents a security risk, Jeff refuses to abandon the organisation's humanitarian principles and immediately dispatches Scott (voiced by Shane Rimmer), Virgil and Alan in Thunderbirds 1 and 2. Grandma tells Tin-Tin that Alan is determined to take part in the rescue despite being ill.

Arriving in Thunderbird 1, Scott fires a series of metal spears into the wall behind the truck to shield it from rockfalls. Virgil and Alan lower Thunderbird 2s magnetic grabs and move in to pick up the truck, but are forced to back away when the craft's thrusters begin tipping it over. Scott uses Thunderbird 1s nose cone to prop up the truck, bearing the load while Virgil and Alan complete the lift. Proving too heavy for the grabs, the truck slips loose, falls to the ground and explodesbut not before Eddie jumps to safety. The Tracys depart without landing, preventing Eddie from identifying them. Tin-Tin calls Alan to express concern for his health, and to Grandma's delight, the pair agree to talk as soon as Alan gets home.

Production
As originally scripted, the episode did not feature a love triangle between Alan Tracy, Tin-Tin Kyrano and Eddie Houseman; the subplot about Eddie and Tin-Tin's relationship, and Alan's rivalry with Eddie, was added later to help fill out the 50-minute running time. Marcus Hearn notes that the invented term "nutomic" was frequently used in the Andersons' earlier series Fireball XL5.

Eddie's explosives truck was designed by special effects assistant Mike Trim. The filming model was built using parts of the International Rescue transmitter truck from "Sun Probe". The puppet-scale set representing the truck's interior featured controls and seats previously seen in "Trapped in the Sky", "The Uninvited" and "Martian Invasion". A shot of Eddie landing on the ground after jumping clear of the truck used a puppet of Scott Tracy instead of the Eddie guest character. The incidental music was recorded on 7 May 1965 with a 24-member ensemble.

Scenes from "End of the Road" appear as a flashback in the clip show episode "Security Hazard", which features a modified version of Eddie's truck as an International Rescue fire-fighting vehicle.

Reception
Marcus Hearn acknowledges the episode's "relatively sophisticated emotional dilemmas", noting especially the "element of domestic tension" provided by the romantic rivalry between Alan, Tin-Tin and Eddie. He adds that Alan and Tin-Tin's reconciliationas well as International Rescue's commitment to saving Eddie, despite the risk to its securityshows that there is "no place for moral ambiguity or unhappy endings" in the series. He suggests that Eddie and Bob Gray's "boardroom drama-style" confrontation was influenced by The Plane Makers, a drama series about power struggles among the staff of an aircraft factory. (Hearn points out that this series was a favourite of Gerry Anderson.)

Mark Braxton praises the romantic storyline for its realism, particularly during the scene in which Virgil and Gordon make fun of Alan. In contrast, Tom Fox of Starburst magazine calls the subplot "lightweight", also describing Tin-Tin's falling out with Alan as "stereotypical petulance". He rates the episode three out of five, judging it "semi-suspenseful".

For Braxton, "End of the Road" is one of a number of episodes – also including "Pit of Peril" and "Path of Destruction" – which incorporate themes of "mechanisation despoiling the natural world". He considers the focus on road-building highly topical for 1960s Britain, pointing out that this decade saw the construction of many motorways as well as changes in road speed limits. Braxton also notes the episode's portrayal of the "destructive potential of workplace pressures", viewing this as a forerunner of the interpersonal conflicts depicted in the Andersons' live-action series UFO. He argues that Eddie and Gray's disagreements over company direction characterise them as "two sides of the corporate coin". Summing up, Braxton concludes that although the plot is heavily dependent on coincidence, its "richly satisfying mix" of themes keeps the audience entertained.

References

Works cited

External links

1965 British television episodes
Television episodes set in Asia
Thunderbirds (TV series) episodes